The 1986 College Football All-America team is composed of college football players who were selected as All-Americans by various organizations and writers that chose College Football All-America Teams in 1986. The National Collegiate Athletic Association (NCAA) recognizes five selectors as "official" for the 1986 season. They are: (1) the American Football Coaches Association (AFCA); (2) the Associated Press (AP) selected based on the votes of sports writers at AP newspapers; (3) the Football Writers Association of America (FWAA); (4) the United Press International (UPI) selected based on the votes of sports writers at UPI newspapers; and (5) the Walter Camp Football Foundation (WC).  Other notable selectors included Football News the Newspaper Enterprise Association (NEA), Scripps Howard (SH), and The Sporting News (TSN).

Consensus All-Americans
The following charts identify the NCAA-recognized consensus All-Americans for the year 1986 and displays which first-team designations they received.

Offense

Defense

Special teams

Full selections - offense

Quarterbacks 

 Vinny Testaverde, Miami (Fla.) (CFHOF) (AFCA, AP-1, FWAA, UPI-1, WC, NEA, SH, TSN)
 Jim Harbaugh, Michigan (AP-2, UPI-2)
 Kevin Murray, Texas A&M (AP-3)

Running backs 

 Brent Fullwood, Auburn  (AFCA, AP-1, FWAA, UPI-1, WC, FN-1, NEA, SH, TSN)
 Paul Palmer, Temple  (AFCA, AP-1, FWAA, UPI-1, WC, FN-1, NEA, SH, TSN)
 Terrence Flagler, Clemson  (AP-3, FWAA, FN-3)
 Brad Muster, Stanford (AFCA, UPI-2, FN-2)
 D. J. Dozier, Penn State (UPI-2, WC, FN-2)
 Steve Bartalo, Colorado St. (AP-2)
 Bobby Humphrey, Alabama (AP-2, FN-2)
 Gaston Green, UCLA (AP-3, FN-3)
 Thurman Thomas, Oklahoma State (CFHOF) (FN-3)

Wide receivers 

 Cris Carter, Ohio State (AFCA, AP-1, UPI-1, WC, FN-1, NEA, SH)
 Tim Brown, Notre Dame (CFHOF) (AP-1, UPI-1, FN-1, SH, TSN)
 Wendell Davis, LSU (AP-2, FWAA, UPI-2, FN-2, TSN)
 Michael Irvin, Miami (Fla.) (AP-2, UPI-2, NEA)
 Sterling Sharpe South Carolina (AP-3, FN-2)
 Marc Zeno, Tulane (AP-3)
 J. R. Ambrose, Ole Miss (FN-3)
 Nasrallah Worthen, North Carolina State (FN-3)

Tight ends 

 Keith Jackson, Oklahoma  (CFHOF) (AFCA, AP-1, FWAA, UPI-1, WC, TSN)
 Rod Bernstine, Texas A&M (AP-2, UPI-2, NEA)
 Robert Await, San Diego St. (AP-3)

Centers 

 Ben Tamburello, Auburn  (AFCA, AP-1, FWAA, UPI-1, WC, FN-1, NEA, SH, TSN)
 Gregg Rakoczy, Miami (Fla.) (AP-2)
 John Davis, Georgia Tech (UPI-2)
 Joe Tofflemire, Arizona (FN-2)
 Eric Coyle, Colorado (AP-3)
 Bob Maggs, Ohio State (FN-3)

Offensive guards 

 Jeff Bregel, USC (AFCA, AP-1, UPI-1, WC, FN-1, NEA, SH, TSN)
 Jeff Zimmerman, Florida (WC, FN-2 [OT], SH)
 Paul Kiser, Wake Forest  (FWAA, TSN)
 Chris Conlin, Penn State  (AP-2 [OT], FWAA)
 Dave Croston, Iowa  (FWAA)
 Mark Hutson, Oklahoma (AP-1, UPI-2)
 Randall McDaniel, Arizona State (CFHOF) (AFCA)
 John Phillips, Clemson (UPI-1, FN-2)
 Steve Trapilo, Boston College (AP-2, UPI-2, NEA)
 Anthony Phillips, Oklahoma (FN-1)
 Fred Childress, Arkansas (AP-2)
 Doug Aronson, San Diego St. (AP-3)
 Todd Peat, Northern Illinois (AP-3)
 Eric Andolsek, LSU (FN-3)
 Mark Stepnoski, Pittsburgh (FN-3)

Offensive tackles 

 John Clay, Missouri (AP-2, UPI-1, WC, FN-2, NEA, SH)
 Randy Dixon, Pittsburgh (AFCA, AP-3, UPI-1, WC, FN-1, TSN)
 Danny Villa, Arizona State  (AP-1, FWAA)
 Harris Barton, North Carolina  (AP-1, FN-3, NEA)
 Jumbo Elliot, Michigan (AFCA, AP-3, UPI-2)
 John Davis, Georgia Tech (SH)
 Dave Croston, Iowa (UPI-2, TSN)
 Wilbur Strozier, Georgia (FN-1)
 Tom Welter, Nebraska (FN-3)

Full selections - defense

Defensive ends 

 Jason Buck, BYU (AFCA, FWAA, FN-2, NEA, SH, TSN)
 Reggie Rogers, Washington (AP-2, UPI-1, WC, FN-1, NEA, SH)
 Tony Woods, Pittsburgh (AP-2, FWAA, UPI-1, FN-2, TSN)
 Scott Stephen, Arizona State (FN-2)
 Darrell Reed, Oklahoma (AP-3)
 Daniel Stubbs, Miami (Fla) (AP-2, UPI-2)

Defensive tackles 

 Jerome Brown, Miami (Fla.) (AFCA, AP-1, FWAA, UPI-1, WC, FN-1, NEA, SH, TSN)
 Danny Noonan, Nebraska (AFCA, AP-1, FWAA, UPI-1, WC, FN-1, NEA, SH)
 Tim Johnson, Penn State (AP-2, WC)
 Al Noga, Hawaii (AP-1)
 Tony Cherico, Arkansas (AP-2 [NG], FN-3)
 Jerry Ball, SMU (FN-2)
 Wally Kleine, Notre Dame (FN-2)
 John Bosa, Boston College (AP-3)
 Shawn Knight, Brigham Young (AP-3)
 Henry Thomas, LSU (AP-3 [NG], FN-3)
 Mark Messner, Michigan (FN-3)
 Dan Sileo, Miami (Fla.) (TSN-2, SH , FN-3)

Linebackers 

 Cornelius Bennett, Alabama (CFHOF)  (AFCA, AP-1, FWAA, UPI-1, WC, FN-1, NEA, SH, TSN)
 Brian Bosworth, Oklahoma (CFHOF) (AFCA, AP-1, FWAA, UPI-1, WC, FN-1, NEA, SH, TSN)
 Shane Conlan, Penn State (AFCA, AP-1, FWAA, UPI-1, WC, FN-1, NEA, SH)
 Chris Spielman, Ohio State (CFHOF) (AFCA, AP-1, FWAA, FN-1, NEA, SH, TSN)
 Terry Maki, Air Force (AFCA, AP-3, FN-2)
 Dave Wyman, Stanford (TSN)
 Johnny Holland, Texas A&M (AP-3, FN-1)
 Marcus Cotton, USC (AP-2, FN-3)
 Byron Evans, Arizona (AP-2, FN-2)
 Mike Junkin, Duke (AP-2)
 Ken Norton Jr., UCLA (FN-2)
 Van Waiters, Indiana (AP-3)
 Cedric Figaro, Notre Dame (FN-3)
 Shane Bullough, Michigan State (FN-3)
 Brad Hastings, Texas Tech (FN-3)
 Tyronne Stowe, Rutgers (FN-3)

Defensive backs 

 Thomas Everett, Baylor (AFCA, AP-1, FWAA, UPI-1, WC, FN-1, NEA, SH, TSN)
 Tim McDonald, USC (AFCA, AP-2, FWAA, UPI-1, WC, FN-1, SH)
 Rod Woodson, Purdue (AP-1, UPI-1, FN-2, NEA, SH)
 Bennie Blades,  Miami (Fla.) (CFHOF) (AP-1, UPI-1, SH, TSN)
 Garland Rivers, Michigan (AFCA, WC, FN-3, NEA)
 Deion Sanders, Florida State (CFHOF) (NEA, TSN)
 Gordon Lockbaum, Holy Cross (FWAA)
 John Little, Georgia (AP-2, WC, FN-1)
 Mark Moore, Oklahoma State (AP-1, FN-2)
 Tim Peoples, Washington, (TSN)
 Ray Isom, Penn State (AP-2)
 David Vickers, Oklahoma (AP-2)
 Ron Francis, Baylor (AP-3)
 Harold McGuire, Toledo (AP-3)
 Tom Rotello, Air Force (AP-3, FN-2)
 Deion Sanders, Florida State (AP-3)
 Freddie Robinson, Alabama (FN-3)
 Chuck Cecil, Arizona (FN-3)

Full selections - special teams

Kickers 

 Jeff Jaeger, Washington (AP-1, UPI-1, WC, FN-1)
 Jeff Ward, Texas (AFCA, NEA)
 Marty Zendejas, Nevada-Reno (FWAA)
 Van Tiffin, Alabama (SH)
 Chris Kinzer, Virginia Tech (AP-2, UPI-2, FN-2, TSN)
 John Diettrich, Ball State (AP-3, FN-3)

Punters 

 Barry Helton, Colorado (AP-1, UPI-1, FN-3, TSN)
 Greg Montgomery, Michigan State (FWAA, FN-2, SH)
 Bill Smith, Mississippi (AP-2, WC)
 Greg Horne, Arkansas (AFCA, AP-3, FN-1)

Returners 

 Rod Woodson, Purdue (TSN)

Key 

 Bold – Consensus All-American
 -1 – First-team selection
 -2 – Second-team selection
 -3 – Third-team selection
 CFHOF = College Football Hall of Fame inductee

Official selectors

 AFCA – American Football Coaches Association (AFCA), selected by the members of the AFCA for the Kodak All-America team
 AP – Associated Press
 FWAA – Football Writers Association of America
 UPI – United Press International
 WC – Walter Camp Football Foundation, selected by the nation's college coaches and sports information directors

Other selectors

 FN – Football News 
 NEA – Newspaper Enterprise Association, the NEA/World Almanac team
 TSN – The Sporting News
 SH – Scripps Howard

See also
 1986 All-Big Eight Conference football team
 1986 All-Big Ten Conference football team
 1986 All-Pacific-10 Conference football team
 1986 All-SEC football team

References 

All-America Team
College Football All-America Teams